The Ponderosa is a television series developed by Bonanza creator David Dortort for PAX TV that ran for the 2001–2002 television season.

Envisioned as a prequel to the NBC series Bonanza, covering the time when the Cartwrights first arrived at the Ponderosa, when Adam and Hoss were teenagers and Joe a little boy, it had less gunfire, brawling and other traditional western elements than the original.

Bonanza creator David Dortort approved PAX TV's decision to hire Beth Sullivan, creator and executive producer of Dr. Quinn: Medicine Woman, to oversee scripts and executive produce, which some believe gave the series a softer edge.

The Ponderosa was canceled after one season, in part because of disappointing ratings and high production costs. Although Sullivan had hoped to film the series in and around Los Angeles, PAX decided to film in Australia to reduce costs.
 
The series should not be confused with Ponderosa, the title used for Bonanza reruns aired on NBC in mid-1972.

Premise
Territory of Nevada, year 1849: ten years before the original Bonanza starts, the Cartwright family moves onto some scrub land. In this new land Ben Cartwright, a new widower, tries to raise his three young sons – at their late teens Adam and Hoss, and a pre-teen Joseph, commonly known as Little Joe.

Cast

Main
 Matt Carmody as Adam Cartwright
 Daniel Hugh Kelly as Ben Cartwright
 Drew Powell as Hoss Cartwright
 Jared Daperis as Little Joe Cartwright

Recurring
 Brad Dourif as Frenchy
 Josephine Byrnes as Margaret Green
 Fernando Carrillo as Carlos Rivera de Vega
 Sara Gleeson as Tess Greene
 Nicky Wendt as Shelby Sterritt
 Gareth Yuen as Hop Sing
 Marcella Toro (episodes 6–7) and Jaqueline Aries (episodes 10–16) as Isabella Maria Rivera de Vega
 Peter Stefanou as Jorge

Episodes

Home release
Shortly after the series first aired, four episodes were released on two DVDs. The first DVD featured both parts of the pilot episode, while the second featured "Brother vs. Brother" and "Treasure".

On May 25, 2004, The Ponderosa: Season 1: Volume 1 was released. This set collects the first ten episodes of the series. No plans have been announced yet to release the last ten episodes of the series on DVD.

Continuity

A number of minor (or perceived) inconsistencies exist between Ponderosa and Bonanza, and a few glaring retcons are present. 
 Most notable among these is the fate of Little Joe's mother. In the original series, her death was depicted in the episode "Marie, My Love" (4x20) as a result of falling off a horse in front of the Ponderosa ranch house. In the new series, she is killed in Virginia City by a miner who is trying to murder Eli Orowitz. Making the situation even more confusing, the pilot for the original series identifies Little Joe's mother as Felicia and not Marie as in the original.
 The Hop Sing character is depicted not only as a cook, but also a family counselor and herbal healer.

References

External links
 
 Matt Carmody's Official Website
 Drew Powell's Official Website

PAX TV original programming
2000s Western (genre) television series
2000s American drama television series
2001 American television series debuts
2002 American television series endings
American prequel television series
English-language television shows
Period family drama television series
Television shows set in Nevada
Television shows filmed in Australia
Television series set in the 1840s
Fiction set in 1849
Bonanza